Šarūnas Birutis (born September 20, 1961 in Šiauliai) is a Lithuanian politician. He was a member of the European Parliament for the Labour Party from 2004 to 2009. In the parliament he joined the Alliance of Liberals and Democrats for Europe.

He received bachelor's degree in economics from Vilnius University in 1984 and master's degree in law from Mykolas Romeris University in 2003. After Lithuania's independence in 1990, Birutis worked establishing and developing tourist industry. In 1999 he joined the Ministry of the Economy as adviser for small and middle businesses. He was a member of the team, negotiating Lithuania's membership in the European Union. In 2004, he was elected to the European Parliament, where he joined the Committee on Industry, Research and Energy and Committee on Internal Market and Consumer Protection. Birutis ran again in 2009, but Labour Party gained only one seat which went to Viktor Uspaskich, leader and founder of the party.

References

1961 births
Living people
Labour Party (Lithuania) MEPs
MEPs for Lithuania 2004–2009
Vilnius University alumni
Mykolas Romeris University alumni
People from Šiauliai
Ministers of Culture of Lithuania
Politicians from Vilnius
Members of the Seimas